The Letter O is the debut studio album by professional basketball player Damian Lillard, under the moniker Dame D.O.L.L.A., which stands for Different on Levels the Lord Allows. The album charted on 119 on the Billboard Hot 200, on 13 on the indie charts,

as well as number 7 on the R&B/Hip-Hop Album charts.

Track listing 

Notes
Initially when Damian Lillard released The Letter O, Cash Money Records had a problem with Lil Wayne being on "Loyal to the Soil," but it was eventually resolved after a short legal dispute.

Charts

Personnel
Derrick "Lottery" Hardy - A&R
 Mike Bozzi - Mastering
 Christopher Henry - Engineer, Mixing Engineer
 Scott Desmarais - Engineer
 Tim O'Sullivan - Assistant Engineer

References

2016 debut albums